Snehalatha Reddy (1932 – 20 January 1977) was an Indian actress, producer and social activist known for her works in Kannada cinema, Kannada theatre, Telugu cinema, and Telugu theatre. She was arrested over her involvement in the Baroda dynamite case and imprisoned for over 8 months during the Emergency in India. She was the co-founder of the Madras Players in the 1960s, the amateur group that staged memorable productions like Ibsen's Peer Gynt, directed by Douglas Alger, besides Twelfth Night and Tennessee William's Night of the Iguana, directed by Peter Coe. Besides, she acted in, directed, or produced plays such as A View from the Bridge and The House of Bernarda Alba. In 2003, her husband Pattabhirama Reddy presented - In the Hour of God, a play based on Sri Aurobindo's classic Savitri, inspired by the mythical woman who defied death for love, which he dedicated to Snehalata Reddy.

Personal life
Snehalatha was born in 1932 to second generation Christian converts from the state of Andhra Pradesh. She strongly opposed the Colonial Rule and her initial years were immersed in the freedom struggle. She resented the British to such an extent that she reverted to her Indian name and wore only Indian clothes. Snehalatha was married to poet and film director Pattabhi Rama Reddy. The couple were devoted to the cause of renowned freedom fighter and activist Dr. Ram Manohar Lohia. Snehalata came under national spotlight for her role in the Kannada film Samskara, written by UR Ananthamurthy and directed by her husband. The film went on to win the National Award in 1970. Her last film Sone Kansari  was released in 1977, after her death. Her daughter Nandana Reddy is a human rights, social and political activist. She is the founder and director of CWC (Concerned for Working Children) a Bangalore-based NGO that was nominated for 2012 Nobel Peace Prize. Nandana has written various memoirs of her mother's ordeals at imprisonment during the Emergency. Her son Konarak Reddy is a musical artist.

Political activism 
Snehalatha and her husband actively participated in the anti-Emergency movement. They spoke out against the tyrannical Indira Gandhi regime and the proclamation of Emergency in consideration with their affiliation to Lohia's principles. She was a close friend of George Fernandes, the trade unionist and politician and was arrested on 2 May 1976 for being a part of the Baroda dynamite case. However, while George Fernandes and 24 others were in the list of accused, Snehalatha's name was not mentioned in final charge-sheet. She was considered guilty by mere association. She was held without trial for eight months in Bangalore Central Jail, enduring regular torture and was subjected to inhumane conditions. Despite having chronic asthma she received irregular treatment and on two occasions even went into an asthmatic coma. Her frail health worsened due to solitary confinement. With her health failing, Snehalatha was eventually released on parole on 15 January 1977. As a result of chronic asthma and debilitating lung infection, she died on 20 January 1977, just 5 days after her release. She is one of the first martyrs of the Emergency.

Madhu Dandavate, who was also in the same jail where Snehalata was imprisoned, writes in his memoir, "I could hear the screams of Snehalata from her cell in the silence of the night".

While in jail, Snehalatha Reddy had maintained a diary which was published by the Karnataka Human Rights Committee in 1977 in a compilation titled A Prison Diary. A documentary was made based on her diary in year 2019.

Filmography
Samskara (1970) 
Chanda Marutha (1977)
Sone Kansari (1977)

References

External links 
 

1932 births
1977 deaths
Indians imprisoned during the Emergency (India)
Actresses in Kannada cinema
Indian stage actresses
Indian film actresses
Actresses from Bangalore
Victims of police brutality
20th-century Indian actresses
Karnataka politicians
Indian arts administrators
Indian human rights activists
Kannada screenwriters
Kannada film directors
Indian women film directors
Indian women film producers
Film producers from Andhra Pradesh
20th-century Indian film directors
Actresses in Telugu cinema
Actresses in Tamil cinema
Film directors from Andhra Pradesh
Indian women activists
Indian civil rights activists
Social workers from Karnataka
Social workers from Andhra Pradesh
20th-century Indian screenwriters
Women civil rights activists